The 2021–22 Liga 1, also known as BRI Liga 1 for sponsorship reasons, was the fifth season of Liga 1 under its current name and the 12th season of the top-flight Indonesian professional league for association football clubs since its establishment in 2008. The season started on 27 August 2021. Bali United were the defending champions from the 2019 season after the 2020 season was abandoned and declared void after three matches due to the COVID-19 pandemic.

On 25 March 2022, Bali United succeeded in defending their title for the second consecutive season, after second placed Persib draw to Persik, giving Bali United a 4-point lead with only one game left.

Effects of the COVID-19 pandemic

Cancellation of the 2020 season 
PSSI canceled the 2020 Liga 1 season after putting it under suspension twice due to the COVID-19 pandemic. The first suspension was announced after finishing matchday three on 15 March 2020, two weeks after the government announced the first cases of COVID-19 in Indonesia. The initial suspension was only for two weeks but it was extended to 29 May 2020. However, the government blocked every attempt to resume the competition. On 27 June 2020, PSSI issued a decree to continue Liga 1 from October 2020.

After failing to obtain government and police permissions for the umpteenth time, PSSI on 29 September 2020 announced the second postponement of the 2020 season of Liga 1 and Liga 2. This time the initial suspension had a one-month period. After the end date was reached, PSSI on 29 October 2020 declared the 2020 football seasons could not be held in 2020. There was an attempt to resume the 2020 season in 2021. However, on 15 January 2021, PSSI decided to cancel the 2020 season of all football competitions and declared them void.

2021 season plans 
PSSI and PT LIB plan to hold the 2021 season in coordination with the Indonesian Police and other state agencies despite the ongoing COVID-19 pandemic in Indonesia, the country with the most COVID-19 cases in Southeast Asia. The original plan was to hold it from 11 June 2021 and finish on 11 March 2022. After months of debate, PSSI decided against eliminating the relegation and promotion system, an option that many cash-strapped clubs proposed. PSSI also changed the starting date to early July 2021. COVID-19 restrictions in many cities on Java island delayed the commencement to late August 2021.

In order to obtain government permission, PSSI and PT LIB themselves had to incorporate various COVID-19 restrictions for the 2021 season, including disallowing fans to be inside or outside the stadium before, during, and after matches. Only a maximum of 299 people, including players, coaches, team officials, security personnel, and special guests, are allowed to enter the stadium. In addition, all entrants are required to be tested, pass temperature checks, wear masks, and follow other health protocols. All players also must be fully vaccinated to be eligible to play. All matches are expected to be played on main island of Java to reduce contagion risks from air travel, leading to protests from non-Java teams that must relocate their base to a Java city.

As a simulation for the 2021 season, PSSI held the 2021 Menpora Cup as a pre-season tournament for the Liga 1 teams. The event was held as a reference in implementing health protocols so that government and police officials become convinced that professional football matches would not turn into super-spreader events.

2021 format
Cognizant of the fluctuating situation caused by the COVID-19 pandemic, PSSI and PT LIB decided the league format will be divided into six series that consider the infection levels across Java island. Each series will cover 45-54 matches (five to six matchdays) played in multiple designated regions to ensure no club will play in their home grounds. The venues can change days ahead of schedule if certain regions are deemed as COVID-19 red zones or violations to COVID-19 rules occurred at a specific stadium.

The first series (six matchdays) will be held in the provinces of Banten, West Java, and DKI Jakarta with six stadiums (Benteng Taruna Stadium, Pakansari Stadium, Patriot Stadium (Indonesia), Wibawa Mukti Stadium, Gelora Bandung Lautan Api Stadium and Jalak Harupat Stadium). The second series is planned to be held in the provinces Central Java and Special Region of Yogyakarta with five stadiums (Jatidiri Stadium, Citarum Stadium, Manahan Stadium, Maguwoharjo Stadium and Sultan Agung Stadium). The third series is planned to entirely run in East Java province but in different nine stadiums (Gelora Bung Tomo Stadium, Gelora 10 November Stadium, Kanjuruhan Stadium, Gajayana Stadium, Surajaya Stadium, Petrokimia Stadium, Gelora Delta Stadium, Brawijaya Stadium, Gelora Bangkalan Stadium).

The fourth and fifth series will be held in Bali with limited supporters in four stadiums (Kapten I Wayan Dipta Stadium (Gianyar), Ngurah Rai Stadium (Denpasar), Kompyang Sujana Stadium (Denpasar), and Samudra Stadium (Badung)), before the sixth and last series is planned to take place at venues in the kick-off series in the provinces of Banten, West Java, and DKI Jakarta.

Teams 
Eighteen teams are competing in the league – all teams retained from the scrapped 2020 season.

Name changes 
 In early 2020, TIRA-Persikabo changed its name to Persikabo 1973.
 In late 2020, Bhayangkara relocated to Surakarta from Jakarta and changed its name to Bhayangkara Solo. However, the changes were annulled, according to PSSI in its 2021 annual congress.

Stadiums and locations 

Notes:

Personnel and kits 
Note: Flags indicate national team as has been defined under FIFA eligibility rules. Players and coaches may hold more than one non-FIFA nationality.

Notes:
 On the front of shirt.
 On the back of shirt.
 On the sleeves.
 On the shorts.
Additionally, SPECS made referee kits and also supplied the match ball, the Illuzion II.

Captaincy changes:

Coaching changes

Foreign players 
PSSI restricts the number of foreign players to four per team with one of them must come from an association member from the Asian Football Confederation. Teams can use all the foreign players at once.
 Players name in bold indicates the player was registered during the mid-season transfer window.
 Former Player(s) were players that out of squad or left club within the season, after pre-season transfer window, or in the mid-season transfer window, and at least had one appearance.

League table

Results

Season statistics

Top goalscorers

Discipline 

 Most yellow card(s): 11
  Marc Klok (Persib)
  Manahati Lestusen (Persikabo 1973)
 Most red card(s): 2
  Ezechiel N'Douassel (Bhayangkara)
  Akbar Hermawan (Persela)

Hat-tricks

Awards

Monthly awards

Annual awards

See also 
 2021–22 Liga 2
 2021–22 Liga 3

References

External links 
 

 
Liga 1 seasons
Liga 1
Liga 1
Indonesia
Liga 1